Kayani or Kiani is a name of Iranian origin and may refer to:

 Kayanian dynasty, Iran
 Kayani Ghakar, a tribe in Pakistan
 Ashfaq Parvez Kayani (born 1952), Pakistani army general
 Muhammad Rustam Kayani (1902–1962), Pakistani jurist and Chief Justice of West Pakistan
 Mohsin Akhtar Kayani (born 1970), Pakistani jurist and Islamabad High Court justice

See also
 Kayanis (disambiguation)
 Kiani (disambiguation)